Daiwa-ike  is an earthfill dam located in Hiroshima Prefecture in Japan. The dam is used for irrigation. The catchment area of the dam is 1.5 km2. The dam impounds about 2  ha of land when full and can store 152 thousand cubic meters of water. The construction of the dam was started on 2000 and completed in 2004.

References

Dams in Hiroshima Prefecture